Mikaela Joslin Mayer (born July 4, 1990) is an American professional boxer. She is a former a unified super featherweight world champion, holding the WBO female title since 2020 and the IBF female title since November 2021, before losing both in October 2022. As an amateur she won a bronze medal at the 2012 World Championships and competed for the U.S. at the 2016 Olympics. As of February 2021, she is ranked as the world's second best active female super featherweight by BoxRec and third by The Ring, as well as the tenth best active female, pound for pound, by The Ring.

Amateur career 
Mayer competed internationally as part of Team USA in the women's 60 kg category at the 2016 Rio Summer Olympics. She defeated Jennifer Chieng in Round 16 before being eliminated in the quarterfinal by Russian Anastasia Belyakova, who took a majority decision.

Amateur accolades 
 2016 AIBA Americas Qualifier: Gold Medalist, Lightweight 60 kg (132 lb)
 2016 Olympic Trials Champion
 2015 USA Boxing National Champion 60 kg (132 lb)
 2014 USA Boxing National Champion 60 kg (132 lb)
 2012 AIBA Women's World Boxing Championships: Bronze Medalist, Light welterweight 64 kg (141 lb)
 2012 AMBC Continental Championships: Gold Medalist 64 kg (141 lb)
 2012 USA Boxing National Champion 64 kg (141 lb)
 2012 U.S. Olympic Team Trials: Runner-Up 60 kg (132 lb)
 2011 National Golden Gloves: Champion 60 kg (132 lb)

Professional career 
After signing with Top Rank, Mayer made her debut in August 2017. She defeated Widnelly Figueroa by knockout in one round.

Professional boxing record

Personal life
Between 2003 and 2005, Mayer played bass in a heavy metal band Lia-Fail; the band included Nita Strauss.

References

Other sources

External links

 

1990 births
Living people
American women boxers
Boxers from Los Angeles
Boxers at the 2016 Summer Olympics
Olympic boxers of the United States
AIBA Women's World Boxing Championships medalists
Super-featherweight boxers
Lightweight boxers
World super-featherweight boxing champions
World Boxing Organization champions
International Boxing Federation champions
The Ring (magazine) champions
21st-century American women